Vlatko Dulić (20 April 1943 – 20 November 2015) was a Croatian theatre, television and film actor and theatre director.

Hailing from Subotica in Vojvodina, a province of Serbia, Dulić studied acting at the Zagreb Academy of Dramatic Art, where he graduated from in 1970 but he began acting as early as 1968 at the Gavella theatre in Zagreb.

He appeared in a number of supporting roles in Croatian TV series and feature films in a career spanning over four decades, including Vinko Brešan's popular comedies How the War Started on My Island (1996) and Marshal Tito's Spirit (1999). He died on 20 November 2015, aged 72.

Selected filmography
A Man Who Liked Funerals (Čovjek koji je volio sprovode, 1989)
How the War Started on My Island (Kako je počeo rat na mom otoku, 1996)
Marshal Tito's Spirit (Maršal, 1999)
Madonna (Bogorodica, 1999)
Cashier Wants to Go to the Seaside (Blagajnica hoće ići na more, 2000)
Sleep Sweet, My Darling (Snivaj, zlato moje, 2005)
Libertas (2006)

References

External links

1943 births
2015 deaths
Actors from Subotica
Croatian male actors
Croats of Vojvodina
Burials at Mirogoj Cemetery